Chamaita fasciata is a moth of the family Erebidae. It is found on the Dampier Archipelago.

References

Nudariina
Moths described in 1916